Augustin-Charles d'Aviler (or Daviler) (1653 – 23 June 1701) was a 17th-century French architect. He was one of the main promoters of the vignolesc canon, but far from simply publishing it, he developed it by proposing variations of motifs to give more flexibility and expressiveness to the rigid system of the five orders.

Biography 

His qualities as an architect earned him a scholarship to the Académie de France à Rome. He left in 1674 with Antoine Desgodetz, but the ship that was taking him to Italy was stormed by the Moors, and he was held in slavery for 18 months in Algiers and then in Tunis. He finally reached Rome, and studied there from 1676 to 1679 under the direction of Charles Errard.

As soon as he returned, he undertook a commentary on the theory of the "5 orders" by Giacomo Barozzi da Vignola.

In order to acquire a real practice, he was an apprentice architect from 1684 to 1689 under the direction of Jules Hardouin-Mansart. Upon Colbert's death, he obtained the protection of Louvois, which allowed him to publish a complete Cours d'architecture (1691).

He then settled in Montpellier where the orders which were addressed to him multiplied, including the Porte du Peyrou and the beginnings of the development of this vast esplanade similar to a royal square (the equestrian statue of Louis XIV thrones in its middle).

Overwhelmed by work, Aviler lost his health there and died prematurely in Montpellier.

Works 
Bibliography online on "Architectura" 

 Augustin-Charles d'Aviler, Cours d'architecture..., Paris, Nicolas Langlois, 1691, http://architectura.cesr.univ-tours.fr/Traite/Notice/ENSBA_LES223.asp?param=
  Digital

Augustin-Charles d'Aviler - Cours d'architecture (1691), rééd. éditions de l'Espérou, series Publications de l'université de Montpellier 3.

References

Bibliography 
Thierry Verdier - Augustin-Charles d'Aviler, architecte du roi en Languedoc 1653-1701 - Les presses du Languedoc - , 588 pages.

External links 
 Augustin-Charles d’Aviler

17th-century French architects
1653 births
1701 deaths
Architects from Paris